United States gubernatorial elections were held in 1954, in 34 states, concurrent with the House and Senate elections, on November 2, 1954 (September 13 in Maine). The special election in Florida was due to the death of incumbent governor Daniel T. McCarty on September 28, 1953.
 
In Tennessee, the governor was elected to a 4-year term for the first time, instead of a 2-year term.

Notes

References

 
November 1954 events in the United States